Park Avenue South is 2003 live album by pianist Dave Brubeck and his quartet. The album was recorded over two nights in a branch of Starbucks in Manhattan.

Reception

Ken Dryden reviewed the album for Allmusic and wrote that "The musicians seem very stimulated by the odd surroundings, producing an enticing mix of standards, new Brubeck compositions, and the inevitable "Take Five"...Brubeck wrote the mournful "Elegy" for Norwegian journalist Randi Hultin, who died of cancer before she was able to hear it. The combination of Militello's haunting flute, Michael Moore's matchless arco bass, Randy Jones' soft use of mallets, and the leader's understated piano is powerful enough to hush any audience".

Reviewing the album for the Jazz Times, Doug Ramsey wrote that "We don't know whether Brubeck used his frequent tactic of stimulating his colleagues by launching into standards they don't expect, but freshness and spontaneity of surprise nonetheless saturate...Freshness is Brubeck's stock in trade as he progresses through his ninth decade".

Track listing 
 "On the Sunny Side of the Street" (Dorothy Fields, Jimmy McHugh) – 7:44
 "Love for Sale" (Cole Porter) – 8:36
 "Elegy" (Dave Brubeck) – 4:54
 "Don't Forget Me" (Brubeck) – 11:01
 "Love Is Just Around the Corner" (Lewis E. Gensler, Leo Robin) – 8:17
 "On a Slow Boat to China" (Frank Loesser) – 4:46
 "I Love Vienna" (Brubeck) – 6:41
 "Crescent City Stomp" (Brubeck) – 6:14
 "Take Five" (Paul Desmond) – 6:54
 "Show Me the Way to Go Home" (Irving King) – 6:17

Personnel 
 Dave Brubeck - piano, liner notes
 Bobby Militello - alto saxophone, flute
 Michael Moore - double bass
 Randy Jones - drums

Production
 Russell Gloyd - producer
 Erica Brenner, Tommy Moore - editing
 Jack Renner - engineer
 Robert Woods - executive producer
 Robert Friedrich - mixing
 Steve Mazur, James Yates - technical assistance

References

2003 live albums
Dave Brubeck live albums
Instrumental albums
Starbucks in popular culture
Telarc Records live albums